Nick of Time may refer to:

Film and television
 Nick of Time (film), a 1995 thriller film by John Badham
 "Nick of Time" (The Twilight Zone), a 1960 episode of The Twilight Zone

Music
 Nick of Time (album), 1989, by Bonnie Raitt
 "Nick of Time" (song), the title song
 "Nick of Time", a 1988 song by AC/DC from Blow Up Your Video
 "Nick of Time", a 2004 song by Marcin Rozynek from Następny Będziesz Ty

Literature
 The Nick of Time, a 2002 novel by Francis King
 The Nick of Time: Essays on Haiku Aesthetics, a 2001 collection of essays about haiku by Paul O. Williams
 The Nick of Time, a 1985 science fiction novel by George Alec Effinger
 Nick of Time, a 2008 novel by Ted Bell

Other uses
 Nick of Time, an unreleased computer game by The Dreamers Guild

See also
 In the Nick of Time (disambiguation)